The 2016–17 SV Mattersburg season saw the club take part in the League and Cup.

Squad 
.

Transfers

Summer

In:

Out:

Winter

In:

Out:

Competitions

Bundesliga

Table

Results summary

Results by matchday

Results

Austrian Cup

Statistics

Appearances and goals

|-
|colspan="14"|Players away on loan :
|-
|colspan="14"|Players who left SV Mattersburg during the season:
|}

Goal scorers

Disciplinary Record

References

External links 
  
 SV Mattersburg at UEFA.COM
 SV Mattersburg at EUFO.DE
 SV Mattersburg at Weltfussball.de
 SV Mattersburg at Football Squads.co.uk
 SV Mattersburg at National Football Teams.com
 SV Mattersburg at Football-Lineups.com

SV Mattersburg seasons
Mattersburg